Sonowal is a designation of the gold-washers of Assam. They were previously addressed as Xunia thakur.

Etymology 
The name Sonowal comes from the word 'Son' which means gold in Assamese.

History 
Sonowal was a multicaste 'khel' (guild) of the many khels that existed in the Ahom Kingdom of the late medieval period. This khel was involved in the gold-washing business and it consisted paiks from different communities viz, Kacharis, Bihiyas (Chutias),Koch, Miri (Mising), Dafla ([[Nyishi people|Nyishi]]) and Keot. However, the Kachari and Bihiya Sonowals were most numerous. Most of these Sonowals migrated from Sadiya and Sisi-Dhemaji regions respectively and resided in the forested area between the Buri Dihing and Dibru rivers (Matak territories) during the early 19th century. Gold-washing was the occupation of Sonowal paiks but other paiks sometimes used to join them and receives their share.

Although the designation of these paiks was Sonowal, they were generally known only by the names of their 'khel' or tribe or chief under whom they resided. They were placed in different parts of the country (Assam) under the authority of Phukans, Baruahs and other chiefs.

However, the Kachari Sonowal was a distinct class from rest of the Sonowals. And unlike others, they were entirely under the orders of the King himself, and they supplied him with gold when called upon to do so. They formerly resided at Sadiya and its vicinity.

Some Sonowals were associated with Silver-washing, they were called  Rupowal or '''Rupia Thakur'.

Sonowals Today 
The Keot Sonowals got extinct in the due course of time. The Kachari Sonowal is the only khel that exist today and recognized as one of the Scheduled tribe of Assam.

Surnames 
The paiks in a khel were organized under a gradation of officials who commanded a set number of them. They were Bora (20 paiks), Saikia (100), Hazarika (1000), Baruah and Phukan (6000).

It is to be noted that the designations Thengal Baruah and Sonowal Baruah were introduced only in the reign of the Ahom King Purandar Singha (1818–19, 1833–1838). These officers remained in overall charges of these guilds and had to take a note of the total output of such washings conducted under the state initiative.

Formerly, the descendants of these officials used to use these designations as surnames. But as these surnames are common to all Assamese people irrespective of their caste, some frauds were found to take advantage of it in getting ST certificate. Hence, as per guidance of All Assam Tribal Sangha, all the new generation of Kachari Sonowals have started using 'Sonowal' as a surname.

Notable Sonowals 

 Sarbananda Sonowal, Indian politician, former chief minister of Assam.
 Jogendra Nath Hazarika, Indian politician, former chief minister of Assam.
 Pradan Baruah, Indian politician, former member of Assam Legislative assembly, MP of Lakhimpur Lok Sabha.
 Jogesh Das, prominent writer, recipient of Sahitya Academi Award
 Jitul Sonowal, singer, music director, composer, lyricist and entertainer in the field of Assamese music since 1992.
 Lohit Sonowal, inspector of Commando Battalion of Assam Police, awarded the Kirti Chakra military decoration

See also 

 Sonowal Kacharis
 Thengal Kacharis
Rupowal Khel

Notes

References

Printed sources

Internet

Assam
Ahom kingdom
Gold
Social groups of Assam
Assamese nationalism